XHSOM-FM is a community radio station on 106.9 FM in Tlacolula de Matamoros, Oaxaca. The station is owned by the civil association Somos Uno Radio, La Voz de la Comunidad, A.C.

History
The station was awarded on August 8, 2018. Somos Uno Radio had been operating as a pirate station since 2015; it relocated to its assigned 106.9 frequency on June 9, 2019.

References

Radio stations in Oaxaca
Community radio stations in Mexico
Former pirate radio stations
Radio stations established in 2015